The Butcher of Mons is a media name given to an unidentified serial killer who committed five murders between January 1996 and July 1997 in or near the Belgian city of Mons. The name was allegedly chosen because of the high precision of dismemberment the victim's bodies had endured. Then they were placed in plastic bags "clearly visible on the roadside or on a channel embankment".

Discoveries

On March 22, 1997, police officer Olivier Motte discovered eight garbage bags containing human remains below the Rue Emile Vandervelde in Cuesmes. They were then examined by magistrate Pierre Pilette, who determined that the arms and legs in the bags came from three different bodies, all of them women. Of all the bags, five of them appeared to originate from the municipality of Knokke-Heist. On the following day, a ninth bag was found on the same street.

On March 24, a tenth bag was discovered, containing the bust of a woman, on the path of Concern in Mons.

On April 12, two bags were found in Havré, in the rue du Dépôt, near the Haine river, a tributary of the Scheldt. These bags contained one foot, one leg, and a head.

The victims
The human remains were found in the Mons region, as well as in northern France, between March 1997 and April 1998, in garbage bags. The systematic mutilation of the bodies made their identification difficult. The garbage bags were found in places with evocative names: "Avenue des Bassins", in the river Haine, "path of worry", "rue du Dépôt", "chemin de Bethlehem" near the river Trouille,  etc. In addition to the bodies, brightly colored underwear was also found in the bags. All the victims had in common that they frequented the area of Mons railway station, and all were plagued by socio-economic or family issues.

Carmelina Russo
Russo, 42, disappeared on January 4, 1996. Her pelvis was discovered on January 21 in the Scheldt, in the department of Nord in France.

Martine Bohn
Bohn, 43, a former prostitute from France, went missing on July 21, 1996. That same month her bust was fished near Mons, in Haine.

Jacqueline Leclercq
Leclercq, 33, a mother of four children, went missing on December 22, 1996. Her arms and legs were found by a policeman on March 22, 1997, in one of the trash bags below the rue de Emile Vandervelde in Cuesmes.

Nathalie Godart
Godart, 21, disappeared in March 1997. Her bust was found in the Haine.

Begonia Valencia
Valencia, 37, disappeared from her home in Frameries in the summer of 1997. Her skull was found in Hyon.

The investigation
A special investigation cell, called the Corpus cell, was created to solve the murders, headed by magistrate Pierre Pilette. However, since the beginning of the investigation, the cell reported that it was lacking staff due to the case being considered "local". Since 2007, the cell consisted of only four investigators.

Suspects 
During the investigation, several people were suspected of being involved in these murders, but no concrete evidence was found against them.

Smail Tulja 
In February 2007, Smail Tulja was arrested in Montenegro at the behest of United States authorities after being suspected of committing the murders in Belgium as well as a similar murder in 1990 of his wife in New York. Tulja was also suspected of committing two murders in Albania. In February 2009 he was charged with the murder of his wife. However, Montenegro refused to extradite him because of his citizenship and he was sentenced in July 2010 by a Montenegrin court to twelve years in prison for the murder of Mary Beal. In 2012, Montenegrin media reported that Tulja died in prison in February of that year.

The "gypsy"
Investigator Leopold Bogaert said that the "gypsy", an ex-boyfriend of Godart, was indicted and released a fortnight later. DNA exonerated him from the crimes.

Jacques Antoine
In February 2010, a 62-year-old doctor from Strasbourg, Jacques Antoine, was arrested for assaulting a beautician. Shortly before, two letters accusing him of being the butcher, written by his son, had been sent to the investigating judge, the prosecutor and the police. The author of these letters claimed that his father had visited Knokke-Heist many times between 1985 and 1995, with some garbage bags. However, the investigation showed that he wanted to sell them in a Mons store, but was refused because they had too many of them. Doctor Antoine's passion for firearms was also mentioned in the letter, whereas none of the victims of the Butcher were killed using firearms. Similarly, the car described in the letters did not match the one described by a witness. Finally, there was no evidence to establish him as the murderer.

The identity of the killer - as long as the killings in question are the work of one individual - remains unknown to this day. Between the beginning of the investigation in 1997 until 2010, nearly 1000 complaints were made.

See also
 List of fugitives from justice who disappeared
 List of serial killers by country

References

TV documentaries
"The shadow of the butcher of Mons" in Duty of investigation diffused on June 29, 2011 on La Une.
"The mysterious monster of Mons" (third report) in "... in Brussels" on September 30, October 7 and 15, 2013 and September 8, 15, and 23, 2014 in Crimes on NRJ 12.
"Case Leclercq: Skinning the Mons' first report in criminal Chronicles released on 31 May 7 and June 15, the 1 st and 8 November 2014 on TFX.

Radio broadcast
"The Mons Detective" in "The Hour of Crime" presented by Jacques Pradel on RTL.

1996 murders in Belgium
1997 murders in Belgium
Belgian serial killers
Unidentified serial killers
Unsolved murders in Belgium